A Tribute to the Four Horsemen is a tribute album to thrash metal band Metallica. It was re-issued by Nuclear Blast Records in 2003 with a slightly different track listing. The album title is in reference to "The Four Horsemen" from Kill 'Em All and contains covers of songs by Metallica from Kill 'Em All to ReLoad, but omits Load.

The liner notes were written by German music journalist Christof Leim, then working for the German edition of Metal Hammer magazine.

Track listing

Metallica tribute albums
2004 compilation albums
Nuclear Blast compilation albums